Liga ASOBAL 2009–10 season (known as the SabadellAtlántico ASOBAL for sponsorship reasons) was the 20th since its establishment. Ciudad Real were the defending champions, having won their 4th La Liga title in the previous season. The campaign began on Saturday, 13 September 2008. The league was originally scheduled to end on 16 May 2009. A total of 16 teams contest the league, 14 of which have already contested in the 2008–09 season, and two of which have been promoted from the División de Honor B. In addition, a new match ball - the SELECT Super Five - is serving as the official ball for all matches. Ciudad Real played a season without a loss and won the title for the 2nd consecutive time.

Promotion and relegation 
Teams promoted from 2008–09 División de Honor B de Balonmano
 Lábaro Toledo
 CB Cangas (Frigoríficos del Morrazo)

Teams relegated to 2009–10 División de Honor B de Balonmano
 Teucro
 Keymare Almería

Team information

League table 
Final standings

Top goal scorers

Top goalkeepers

References

External links
Standings
Liga ASOBAL

Liga ASOBAL seasons
1
Spain